Lac de Suyen is a lake in Hautes-Pyrénées, France. At an elevation of 1536 m, its surface area is 0.02 km².

Lakes of Hautes-Pyrénées